NewSpace India Limited (NSIL) is a Public Sector Undertaking (PSU) of Government of India and commercial arm of Indian Space Research Organisation (ISRO). It was established on 6 March 2019 under the administrative control of Department of Space (DoS) and the Company Act 2013. The main objective of NSIL is to scale up private sector participation in Indian space programmes.

Objectives 
NSIL was setup with the following objectives:

 Transfer of Small Satellite technology to industry: NSIL will obtain license from DoS/ISRO and sub-license the same to industry
 Manufacture of Small Satellite Launch Vehicle (SSLV) in collaboration with private sector
 Production of Polar Satellite Launch Vehicle (PSLV) through Indian industry
 Production and marketing of Space based products and services, including launch and application
 Transfer of technology developed by ISRO Centres and constituent units of DoS
 Marketing of spin-off technologies and products/services, both in India and abroad

Contracts
In 2022, NSIL executed a contract with OneWeb to launch 36 satellites to low earth orbit for their satellite internet constellation.

References 

Government-owned companies of India
Commercial launch service providers
Space programme of India
2019 establishments in Karnataka
Indian companies established in 2019
Companies based in Bangalore